Xiao Yang (1929 – October 9, 1998), born as Chen Zheng, was a politician of the People's Republic of China.

Biography
Xiao Yang was born in Langzhong, Sichuan in 1929.  He was educated in Tsinghua University from 1946 to 1948.

Xiao Yang was the Mayor of Chongqing from 1985 to 1988, Secretary of the CPC Chongqing Committee from 1988 to 1992, and Governor of Sichuan from 1993 to 1996.

Xiao was an alternate member of the 14th CPC Central Committee.

Notes

External links
 Xiao Yang died, People's Daily Overseas edition, October 20, 1998, Section 4.

1929 births
1998 deaths
People's Republic of China politicians from Sichuan
Chinese Communist Party politicians from Sichuan
People from Langzhong
Political office-holders in Chongqing
Political office-holders in Sichuan
Politicians from Nanchong